Richard Daryl Robinson (born 8 June 1946) is a former Australian international cricketer who played in three Test matches and two One Day Internationals, all in 1977.

During a first-class career that spanned from 1971 to 1982, Robinson was widely recognised as the second best wicketkeeper in Australia, behind the formidable Rod Marsh and would no doubt have played more Tests had Marsh not played. Although a wicketkeeper batsman in state cricket, Robinson's three Tests were as a specialist batsman.

Robinson captained Victoria and played World Series Cricket, notably keeping wicket for the Cavaliers on the Cavalier Country Tour in 1978/79 playing 17 matches, scoring 315 runs at 22.50, with 31 catches and 8 stumpings.

Following his retirement from first-class cricket, Robinson coached Queensland before moving to Darwin, Northern Territory to play for Tracy Village Cricket Club, and was awarded the Darwin district Player of the Year award in 1993. In 2013 Robinson was appointed coach of Tracy Village.

Career
Robinson had a superb 1976–77 season scoring 828 first class runs at 82.80 including four centuries with a top score of 185. He was selected on the 1977 Ashes tour as a backup keeper to Rod Marsh. Australia's batsmen struggled on the tour, and Robinson was selected as a specialist batsman in three tests.

He signed to play World Series Cricket which meant he missed the next two seasons of first class cricket.

He played three more seasons of first class cricket until he retired.

References

External links
Victorian Premier Cricket profile

1946 births
Living people
Australia Test cricketers
Australia One Day International cricketers
Victoria cricketers
World Series Cricket players
Australian cricketers
Australian cricket coaches
Cricketers from Melbourne
Wicket-keepers
People from East Melbourne